Aspergillus wisconsinensis is a species of fungus in the genus Aspergillus. It is from the Cervini section. The species was first described in 2016. It has been reported to produce an asparvenone, 4-hydroxymellein, sclerotigenin, two territrems, and cycloaspeptide.

Growth and morphology

A. wisconsinensis has been cultivated on both Czapek yeast extract agar (CYA) plates and Malt Extract Agar Oxoid® (MEAOX) plates. The growth morphology of the colonies can be seen in the pictures below.

References 

wisconsinensis
Fungi described in 2016